Mediafly is a privately held technology company based in Chicago, Illinois that provides mobile enablement software.

History
Mediafly was founded by Carson Conant in 2006 as a podcatcher. In addition to its mobile apps, in 2009, it was one of the first channels to be added to Roku’s channel store. That same year, the company began to transition from a consumer model to a business-to-business model, officially shutting down its podcasting applications in 2012.

In 2014 and 2015, the company was ranked on the Inc. 5000. As of 2015, the company has raised about $10 million from angel investors.

References

Companies based in Chicago
Mobile sales enablement systems